Paria is a genus of leaf beetles in the subfamily Eumolpinae. There are about 40 described species in Paria in North and South America, 19 of which are known north of Mexico. The genus is very similar to Typophorus.

Species

 Paria aeneipennis (Baly, 1878)
 Paria aemula Weise, 1921
 Paria aphthonina Bechyné & Bechyné, 1961
 Paria arizonensis Wilcox, 1957
 Paria aterrima (Olivier, 1808)
 Paria atripennis (Lefèvre, 1878)
 Paria badia Bechyné & Bechyné, 1961
 Paria barnesi Wilcox, 1957
 Paria binotata Jacoby, 1891
 Paria blatchleyi Wilcox, 1957
 Paria brunnea Jacoby, 1882
 Paria canella (Fabricius, 1801)
 Paria corumbana (Bechyné, 1951)
 Paria degenerata Weise, 1921
 Paria desculpta Bechyné & Bechyné, 1961
 Paria epimeralis (Bechyné, 1955)
 Paria erythopa (Lefèvre, 1888)
 Paria festinata (Bechyné, 1950)
 Paria fragariae Wilcox, 1954 (strawberry rootworm) (may be a species complex?)
 Paria fragariae fragariae Wilcox, 1954
 Paria fragariae kirki Balsbaugh, 1970
 Paria frosti Wilcox, 1957
 Paria fulvipennis (Lefèvre, 1884)
 Paria geniculata (Lefèvre, 1878)
 Paria horvathi (Bechyné, 1955)
 Paria laevipennis Jacoby, 1882
 Paria lepidoptera Bechyné, 1951
 Paria mesostigma Bechyné, 1954
 Paria montanella (Bechyné, 1951)
 Paria nigripennis (Lefèvre, 1884)
 Paria nigronotata (Lefèvre, 1877)
 Paria obliquata Bechyné, 1951
 Paria obliquata capitata Bechyné, 1957
 Paria obliquata obliquata Bechyné, 1951
 Paria opacicollis LeConte, 1859 (oak paria)
 Paria opacicollis opacicollis LeConte, 1859
 Paria opacicollis wenzeli Wilcox, 1957
 Paria picta Jacoby, 1891
 Paria pratensis Balsbaugh, 1970
 Paria pusilla (Lefèvre, 1876)
 Paria quadriguttata LeConte, 1858 (willow paria)
 Paria quadrinotata (Say, 1824)
 Paria quadriplagiata (Jacoby, 1876)
 Paria scutellaris (Notman, 1920)
 Paria sellata (Horn, 1892)
 Paria sexnotata (Say, 1824) (juniper paria)
 Paria thoracica (F. E. Melsheimer, 1847)
 Paria tibialis Jacoby, 1882
 Paria tincta (Bechyné, 1957)
 Paria virginiae Wilcox, 1957
 Paria vittaticollis Baly, 1878
 Paria wilcoxi Balsbaugh, 1970

Species moved to Typophorus:
 Paria jacobyi (Lefèvre, 1884)
 Paria jacobyi atramentaria Weise, 1921
 Paria jacobyi jacobyi (Lefèvre, 1884)
 Paria maculigera Lefèvre, 1888
 Paria nigra Weise, 1921
 Paria nigritarsis Jacoby, 1882
 Paria signata (Lefèvre, 1891)

Species moved to other genera:
 Paria gounellei Lefèvre, 1888: moved to Phytoparia
 Paria stigmula Lefèvre, 1888: moved to Tijucana
 Paria vitticollis Jacoby, 1882: moved to Tijucana

References

Further reading

 
 
 

Eumolpinae
Chrysomelidae genera
Beetles of North America
Beetles of South America
Taxa named by John Lawrence LeConte